Ángel Gabriel Molinari Soto (born July 18, 2000) is a Puerto Rican football player who currently plays as a goalkeeper for Westchester United F.C.

Club career
Until October 2018 Molinari played for Semilleros Manizales Star Gold Club de Fútbol when he went on trial in Colombia. He joined Once Caldas of the Categoría Primera A in 2018 and 2019. In 2020 he joined Satélite Norte FC  of the Copa Simón Bolívar, the second tier league of Bolivia.
In August 2021 he signed with Westchester United F.C. of the United Premier Soccer League.

Career statistics

International

References

2000 births
Living people
People from Carolina, Puerto Rico
Puerto Rican footballers
Puerto Rican expatriate footballers
Puerto Rico international footballers
Association football goalkeepers
Expatriate footballers in Bolivia